Clematis patens is a species of perennial plant in the genus Clematis in the Ranunculaceae family. It is native to Japan (Honshu, Shikoku, and northern Kyushu) and Northeast Asia. It usually grows on the edge of forests. It is also planted for ornamental purposes.

Etymology 
The name of the genus Clematis is a derivation of the Ancient Greek word "clématis", which means "climbing". This is a description of the tendency that species show to be climbers. And patens means "opening". In Japan, C. patens is called "kazaguruma", which means pinwheel.

Description

Stem
The stems are brown and they become woody.

Flower
White or pale purple single flowers grow at the tips of short shoots in May or June. The calyx that looks like a petal is usually 8 pieces and length of 7–8 cm, but the variation is large depending on the type. Achene is broad-ovate, yellow-brown feather-like.

Leaf
The leaves are pinnate compound leaves consisting of 3–5 leaflets and length of 3–10 cm.

Conservation
C. patens has been designated as Near Threatened (NT) on the Red List by the Ministry of the Environment in Japan, and some prefectures in Japan have been designated as Red List.

Cultural significance 
"The native fabric of Clematis patens" in Uda, Nara was designated as a Japanese national natural monument on 14 January 1948. C. patens has been designated as a city flower in Funabashi, Chiba.

References

External links
 Plants For A Future
 Digital Museum of Hiroshima University

patens
Flora of Asia
Flora of Japan
Taxa named by Joseph Decaisne